The 2007–2008 UCI Track Cycling World Cup Classics was a multi race competition over a season of track cycling. The season began on 30 November 2007 and ended on 17 February 2008. The World Cup is organised by the UCI. The 2007–2008 series carried vital ranking points towards the 2008 Beijing Olympics. The following tables contain only Olympic events, although many non-Olympic events are still held.

Calendar

Men

Women

External links

Round 1, Sydney results and standings
Round 2, Beijing results and standings
Round 3, Los Angeles results and standings
Round 4, Copenhagen results and standings

See also
2007 in track cycling
2008 in track cycling

 
2007 in track cycling
2008 in track cycling
UCI Track Cycling World Cup